Agniolophia schurmanni is a species of beetle in the family Cerambycidae. It was described by Stephan von Breuning in 1983. It is known from Micronesia.

References

Pteropliini
Beetles described in 1983